ANAPROF 2003 is the 2003 season of the Asociación Nacional Pro Fútbol (ANAPROF), the Panamanian professional football league.  The season started on February 26, 2003 with the Torneo Apertura Bellsouth 2003 (Bellsouth Opening Tournament 2003), and ended on October 26, 2003 with the Torneo Clausura Bellsouth 2003 (Bellsouth Closing Tournament 2003). The champion of both the opening and closing tournaments were Tauro; therefore, for the second time in history, Tauro were crowned ANAPROF champions without the need to play a grand final.

Changes for 2003
There was no relegation. ANAPROF expanded the number of teams from eight to ten starting with the 2004 season.
In the closing tournament, the four-team semifinal group was dropped; it was replaced with a pair of home-and-away series featuring the top four teams of the season.
For the closing championship, the final was played in a single match format.

Teams

Apertura 2003

Standings

Results table

Final round

Cuadrangular semifinal

Final 1st Leg

Final 2nd Leg

Top goal scorer

Clausura 2003

Standings

Results table

Final round

Semifinals 1st Leg

Semifinals 2nd Leg

Final

Top goal scorer

ANAPROF 2003 Grand Final
Cancelled, as Tauro won both tournaments.

Local derby statistics

El Super Clasico Nacional - Tauro v Plaza Amador

Clasico del Pueblo - Plaza Amador v El Chorillo

References
RSSF ANAPROF 2003

ANAPROF seasons
1
Pan
1
Pan